The locality Port Leopold is an abandoned trading post in the Qikiqtaaluk Region of Nunavut, Canada. It faces Prince Regent Inlet at the northeast tip of Somerset Island.

Elwin Bay is to the south, while Prince Leopold Island is to the north.

History
In 1848, the English explorer James Clark Ross wintered here during his search for the missing Franklin expedition.

Later, it became the site of a Hudson's Bay Company trading post.

Mapping

Elwin Bay, 
Prince Leopold Island,

References

Ghost towns in Nunavut
Geography of Qikiqtaaluk Region
Ports and harbours of Nunavut
Former populated places in the Qikiqtaaluk Region
Hudson's Bay Company trading posts in Nunavut